Seyyed Mostafa Hosseini Khamenei (born c. 1965) is an Iranian Twelver Shia cleric and the oldest son of Iran's supreme leader, Ali Khamenei.

He is who is also known as "Hujjatul-Islam/Ayatollah Seyyed Mostafa Khamenei", the son-in-law of Azizollah Khoshvaght (عزیزالله خوشوقت). He is also the eldest brother of: Mojtaba, Masoud (Mohsen) and Meitham Khamenei.

Mostafa Khamenei, who participated in the Iran–Iraq War, is a resident of Qom. According to  Ahmad Marvi, who is the assistant of seminary communications in Office of the Supreme Leader of Iran:

See also 

 Ali Khamenei
 Mojtaba Khamenei
 Javad Khamenei

References 

Living people
Children of national leaders
Ali Khamenei
Iranian Shia clerics
1960s births